Club Deportivo Universidad Católica  is a professional football club based in Santiago, Chile. Founded in 1937 they play in the Primera División, the top flight of Chilean football. The team has played its home games at Estadio San Carlos de Apoquindo since 1988.

Universidad Católica has won the third most league championships at a national level. In domestic football, the club has won 28 trophies; a record 16 Primera División de Chile titles, 2 Segunda División de Chile, 4 Copa Chile, 4 Supercopa de Chile, a Copa Apertura, a Copa República. In international competitions, Universidad Católica have won 1 trophies; Copa Interamericana (1994).

In 1993, Universidad Católica was the runner-up in the most important international tournament in South America: the Copa Libertadores de América, losing in the finals against the defending Libertadores' Champion São Paulo. Universidad Católica has reached the semi-finals in the Copa Libertadores four times (years 1962, 1966, 1969 and 1984).

The club's most successful player is José Pedro Fuenzalida with eleven titles, and the player with most appearances is Mario Lepe with 639 games. Its traditional rival is Universidad de Chile, they contest the Clásico Universitario. Colo-Colo is the other big rival of the club.

History

Founding and beginnings in professional football 

While the club was born as one of the many sport branches of the Universidad Católica de Chile, officially founded in 1937, it began, strictly speaking, around 1910, when students of the university would reunite to play football matches, frequently facing historical rival Universidad de Chile. In time, the idea of creating a professional club emerged, and on 21 April 1937, the club officially and legally began. It made its professional debut, in the second division, against the Universidad de Chile. Universidad Católica won its first League title in the 1949 season.

In December 1956, Universidad Católica was placed at the bottom of the league table and relegated to Segunda División for the first time in its history. On 10 November 1956, Universidad Católica won the Segunda División title after defeating Deportes La Serena by 3–2 and gained promotion straight back up to the top division, with captain Sergio Livingstone and Raimundo Infante claiming the top scorer award. In the 1970s, Universidad Católica was facing an institutional, the team ended the 1973 Primera División tournament at the bottom of the table, Universidad Católica was relegated to Segunda División for the second time in its history. In 1975, Universidad Católica won the title and therefore returned to Primera División to play the 1976 season.

In 1993, Universidad Católica reached their first ever Copa Libertadores final. The team had previously eliminated clubs Atlético Nacional (2–0, 1–2 in round of 16), Barcelona (3–1, 1–1 in  quarterfinals) and América de Cali (1-0, 2–2 in semifinals). In the finals, between the two legs after a heavy defeat away la Catolica won the second leg but lost São Paulo the title on aggregate 5–3. With Manuel Pellegrini as manager, on 1 November 1994, after beating Saprissa 5–1 at San Carlos de Apoquindo with goals by Andrés Romero, Alberto Acosta, Juvenal Olmos, Miguel Ardiman and Rodrigo Barrera, Universidad Católica became the second Chilean team to win a Copa Interamericana, they also achieved the 1995 Copa Chile title.

In 1997 the club celebrated its 60th anniversary with a friendly tournament where they beat Ajax Amsterdam 3–2 in the Copa 60º Aniversario de Universidad Católica.

In the 21st century 
Universidad Católica won the title 2002 Primera División (Apertura) after beating Rangers de Talca 4–0 in final at San Carlos de Apoquindo, with Juvenal Olmos as manager. In 2005 the club has been reemerged in international competition, advancing to the 2005 Copa Sudamericana semifinal before being knocked out by the powerful Boca Juniors from Argentina, who would go on to win the tournament. On 22 December, Universidad Católica won their nine Chilean Primera División (Clausura) title, after beating Universidad de Chile's in a penalty shootout at Estadio Nacional. In 2006 the team made a good presentation in the Copa Libertadores, but was eliminated at the last minute by Tigres UANL of Mexico and failed to advance beyond the group stage.

Católica again played 2008 Copa Libertadores with no luck, being eliminated in the group stage by goal difference by River Plate and América. In 2010 Copa Libertadores, their performance was no better, finishing third in group stage behind Universidad de Chile and Flamengo. In the 2010 season a 3–2 defeat to Colo Colo in October gave Colo Colo a seven-point lead in the league with seven match of the season remaining. A victory over Cobreloa 3–2 at Estadio Municipal de Calama, put them one point away from their first title since 2005. In the last match, Universidad Católica defeated Everton 5–0 to secure the club's ten Chilean Primera Division title and end a five-year trophy drought.

In the 2011 season they finished in second place in Chilean Primera División. They also reached the 2011 Copa Chile final where they faced Deportes Magallanes. Universidad Católica won 4–2 in a penalty shoot-out after the match finished 1–1. In 2011 Copa Libertadores, Católica finished first on the group stage, and then advanced to the quarter-finals, knocking out Grêmio of Brazil on the best 16 round, and falling to Peñarol of Uruguay 2–0 in Montevideo and winning their home match 2–1, which was not enough to advance. In 2012 the club again played Copa Libertadores, under coach and former player Mario Lepe, finished last on the group stage, winning only 1 home game and losing on their away games in Colombia and Bolivia. In Copa Sudamericana 2012, Universidad Católica advancing to the semifinal before being knocked out by the powerful São Paulo from Brazil, who would go on to win the tournament.

On April 30, 2016, Universidad Católica won the Primera Division Clausura title in 2016 for the first time in six years. Universidad Católica won the title on the last matchday after beating Audax Italiano 2–1. On 15 September 2016, the club won the Supercopa de Chile for a first time idefeating Universidad de Chile 2–1 in the final. After, Universidad Católica won the Primera Division Apertura, the title was won on 8 December, where Universidad Católica faced Deportes Temuco at Germán Becker. Two goals in the last half-hour secured Universidad Católica a 2–0, with Mario Salas leading the team towards its first Bicampeonato for winning two national titles in a row.

Four consecutive Chilean Primera División 

With Beñat San José as manager, Universidad Católica won the title 2018 on the last matchday after beating Deportes Temuco 2–1. In 2019, with Gustavo Quinteros Universidad Católica won their 2th Supercopa de Chile and won a second consecutive Primera División title. Due to the 2019 Chilean protests, the competition was suspended since mid-October with six matchdays still left. On 29 November 2019, ANFP's Council of Presidents voted to conclude the season. The title was the 14th official league in the club's history. In the 2010s, Universidad Católica won five league championships, a Copa Chile and two Chilean Supercups.

On 14 February 2020, with Ariel Holan Universidad Católica secured their third consecutive Primera División title, they also achieved the semi-finals of Copa Chile. Days after winning the title, Holan announced his resignation as Universidad Católica and in March, Gustavo Poyet was appointed coach, signing a two-year contract, and Universidad Católica won their 3th Supercopa de Chile. In 2021 Copa Libertadores, Católica finished second on the group stage, and then advanced to the round of 16, before being knocked out by the Palmeiras from Brazil, who would go on to win the tournament. On 30 August 2021, Gustavo Poyet was sacked from his managerial position, one day after Cristian Paulucci was announced as the new coach. On 20 January 2021, Universidad Católica won their four Supercopa de Chile title, after beating Ñublense's in a penalty shootout. On 4 December 2021, Universidad Católica were confirmed 2021 Primera División champions, reaching four consecutive league titles.

Crests and colours 
Its official fight song is the Hymn of the Sports Club of the Catholic University, based on the song Tramp! Tramp! Tramp!.

Crests 
The first crest had a design consisting of an interlacing of two initials of the club, "UC", in dark blue on a white shirt.

Kit suppliers and shirt sponsors

Grounds 

After moving between grounds, the team moved to the Independencia Stadium in 1945, which remained its home ground for 26 years and which was demolished because of the financial problems of the club, and started to play at Unión Española Stadium, the Santa Laura. After that, Universidad Católica moved its home matches to San Carlos de Apoquindo, which was inaugurated on 4 September 1988 with a match against River Plate.

The Universidad Católica has attained fame as a favorite of the higher classes, because of many factors, which range from the location of the club's stadium, San Carlos de Apoquindo (in one of the most exclusive neighborhoods of the capital) and Headquarters, although there are "UC" fans all around the country, including popular regions or towns.

Due to the neighborhood's strong influence (wealthy families), the club has been unable to be approved for projects to enlarge the stadium and thus draw larger crowds. Only until in recent years the club was allowed by the commune of Las Condes, to host their clasicos matches against Universidad de Chile and Colo-Colo in their own stadium. Although just a limited number of its rivals' supporters are allowed to be present at these matches due to security reasons inside the stadium and around its high-end neighborhood.

Records and statistics 

Mario Lepe holds the record for most Universidad Católica appearances, having played 639 first-team matches (76 matches for Copa Libertadores de América) from 1982 to 2000. Andrés Romero comes second with 484 appearances. José María Buljubasich is Universidad Católica's all-least beaten goalkeeper, with 1352 minutes (4th on IFFHS ranking).

Universidad Católica's all-time highest goalscorer in official competitions is Rodrigo Barrera with 118 goals, surpassing Raimundo Infante's 113 goals in 2002. Four other players have also scored over 100 goals for Universidad Católica: Alberto Fouillioux (1957-1975), Néstor Isella (1963-1970), Osvaldo Hurtado (1980-1988t) and the previous goalscoring record-holder Raimundo Infante (1941-1956). Infante  being Universidad Católica's top goalscorer of all time in La Liga history with 103 goals.

The IFFHS ranked the team in 8th place in 2012. The club has reached notoriety, both in a national and South American level, as the owner of one of the best infrastructures and training centers in the continent. As such, it is a good source of young talents, which occasionally rise to stardom in the club. Its most recent youth academy produced player known worldwide is Gary Medel, currently playing for Italian side Bologna FC, among other clubs such as Boca Juniors, Sevilla and Internazionale, as well as playing a big role in Chile's 2010 and 2014 World Cup squads.

Officially, the highest attendance figure for a Universidad Católica match is 77,890, which was for a Primera División match at Estadio Nacional on 11 January 1967. Universad Católica has also set records in Chilean football, most notably the most seasons won in a row  (four, during 2018–2021).

Support and rivalries 

Universidad Católica is the third club with the largest following in Chile, with approximately 13% of the total Chilean football fans according to research published in 2006 by Fundación Futuro, according by Spanish newspaper agency Marca in 2012 have approximately 9% and according by Adimark in 2018, have a 7% of the total Chilean football fans.

Clásico Universitario 

There is often a rivalry between the two clubs from academic roots, where the game between Universidad Católica and Universidad de Chile is known as "Clásico Universitario". It is the oldest confrontation between two clubs from academic roots, as the first confrontation goes back to the University Classic of 1909. Rivalry, both in sports and in academic issues, made these matches between the universities become more and more important, eventually reaching the national status of "Universities' Derby".

This clásico has been recognized by FIFA as the most traditional of Chile. They met for the first time on 13 June 1937 in matchday three of the first Serie B at the Estadio Militar. These two teams have played twenty championship definitions against each other, Universidad Católica has won fourteen and Universidad de Chile six.

Honours

 
  shared record

Players

The Chilean Football Federation rules allow a maximum of seven foreign players per team, but only five can be on the pitch at any one time. Currently, Católica has six foreign players.

First-team squad

Youth Academy

Out on loan

2023 Summer transfers

In

Out

Club captains 
Since the establishment of the club in 1937, 19 players have been club captain of Universidad Católica.

Personnel

Current technical staff

Last updated: 19 April 2022 
Source:

Management 

Last updated: 26 December 2021 
Source:

Other sports sections
 Universidad Católica (sports club)

See also
 Universidad Católica de Chile

References

External links

Official websites
 
 CDUCatolica.com 
 Ceatolei 

 
Universidad Catolica
Association football clubs established in 1937
Sport in Santiago
Multi-sport clubs in Chile
University and college association football clubs
1937 establishments in Chile
U